Rafflesia witkampii is a plant species in the genus Rafflesia. Rafflesia witkampii is a parasitic flowering plant. Meijer (1997) provided a comprehensive treatment of Rafflesia in Flora Malesiana, where he reported five "incompletely known species": R. borneensis Koord., R. ciliate Koord,  R. titan Jack, R. tuan-mudae Becc., and R. witkampii Koord. These five species were considered to be incomplete due to the lack of well-preserved specimens or a convincing type specimen, to a poor description, or to a description based on an immature bud. Nais (2001) re-instated R. tuan-mundae, R. witkampii, and R. zollingeriana in his account on Rafflesia.

Rafflesia witkampii is a plant species in the genus Rafflesia.

References

witkampii